Somvang Thammasith is a Laotian politician and former army colonel. He is a member of the Lao People's Revolutionary Party. He was a member of the 6th and 7th term of the National Assembly of Laos.

References

Lao People's Revolutionary Party politicians
Living people
Members of the National Assembly of Laos
People from Attapeu province
Year of birth missing (living people)